The Ford, later St Clair-Ford Baronetcy, of Ember Court in the County of Surrey, is a title in the Baronetage of Great Britain. It was created on 22 February 1793 for Francis Ford, a member of the Council of Barbados and Member of Parliament for Newcastle-under-Lyme. Captain St Clair Ford, youngest son of the second Baronet and grandfather of the sixth Baronet, assumed the additional surname of St Clair in 1878. The sixth Baronet was a captain in the Royal Navy.

Ford, later St Clair-Ford baronets, of Ember Court (1793)

Sir Francis Ford, 1st Baronet (1758–1801), father of Georgiana Welch
Sir Francis Ford, 2nd Baronet (1787–1839)
Sir Francis John Ford, 3rd Baronet (1818–1850), adoptive father of Francina Sorabji
Sir Francis Colville Ford, 4th Baronet (1850–1890)
Sir (Francis Charles) Rupert Ford, 5th Baronet (1877–1948)
Sir Aubrey St Clair-Ford, 6th Baronet (1904–1991)
Sir James Anson St Clair-Ford, 7th Baronet (1952–2009)
Sir Colin Anson St Clair-Ford, 8th Baronet (1939–2012)
Sir Robin Sam St Clair-Ford, 9th Baronet (1941–2016)
Sir (William) Sam St Clair-Ford, 10th Baronet (born 1982)

The heir presumptive is the present holder's brother Peter James St Clair-Ford (born 1984).

Notes

References 
Kidd, Charles, Williamson, David (editors). Debrett's Peerage and Baronetage (1990 edition). New York: St Martin's Press, 1990, 

Saint Clair-Ford
1793 establishments in Great Britain